Northern Region ( Al-Minṭaqat aš-Šamālīyah) was an administrative region of Bahrain in the northern part of the country. Its territory is now in the Northern Governorate.

Former municipalities (regions) of Bahrain